Carn Marth is the name of a hill in Cornwall, England,  United Kingdom, near Redruth. The name of the hill comes from the Cornish language words karn (cairn) and margh, meaning 'horse'.

Geography and history

In prehistoric times men settled on the uplands as they had many advantages over the more densely vegetated lowlands. From the late Stone Age they have been natural places of refuge; offering easily defended bases and view points over what was the densely wooded landscape of prehistoric Britain. In early modern times they have been perfect sites to mark victories and celebrations, and to host warning beacons of impending attack such as the feared Spanish invasion of the 1580s.

The hill can be seen from the hills of Bodmin Moor on a clear day, over : the reverse is also true. The Celtic Sea and Bristol Channel to the north and the English Channel to the south are both easily seen. Those with keen sight or binoculars will be able to pick out St Anthony's Light at the entrance to Carrick Roads with Pendennis Castle and Falmouth opposite. Turning further west there is the glint of light on the reservoir at Stithians, then more hills, Carnmenellis and Carn Brea, with views across the Great Flat Lode and its attendant engine houses making such poignant relics of the great age of mining.

Ecology
The topmost parts of the Carn are clothed in lowland heath, gorse, bracken and a generous mixture of wild flowers. As one would expect this makes for an equally rich population of insects and in turn, as one moves up the food chain, there are small mammals, reptiles and amphibians and then birds being among the most visible. Cuckoos, warblers, swallows drinking on the wing in the flooded quarries, falcons soaring overhead may be seen. Lower down there are fields for grazing, their limits marked by Cornish Hedges. The Carnmarth Trust exists to care for the area.

Other things by the same name
Carnmarth North and Carnmarth South are deaneries of the Diocese of Truro: Carnmarth Deanery was established in 1875, the division into North and South is 20th-century. There is a song called "Carn Marth" on Richard D. James Album, by Cornish electronic musician Aphex Twin.

References

External links 

Information and pictures of Carn Marth

Hills of Cornwall